Ramanujan summation is a technique invented by the mathematician Srinivasa Ramanujan for assigning a value to divergent infinite series. Although the Ramanujan summation of a divergent series is not a sum in the traditional sense, it has properties that make it mathematically useful in the study of divergent infinite series, for which conventional summation is undefined.

Summation 

Since there are no properties of an entire sum, the Ramanujan summation functions as a property of partial sums. If we take the Euler–Maclaurin summation formula together with the correction rule using Bernoulli numbers, we see that:

Ramanujan wrote it for the case p going to infinity:

 

where C is a constant specific to the series and its analytic continuation and the limits on the integral were not specified by Ramanujan, but presumably they were as given above. Comparing both formulae and assuming that R tends to 0 as x tends to infinity, we see that, in a general case, for functions f(x) with no divergence at x = 0:

where Ramanujan assumed  By taking  we normally recover the usual summation for convergent series. For functions f(x) with no divergence at x = 1, we obtain:

C(0) was then proposed to use as the sum of the divergent sequence. It is like a bridge between summation and integration.

The convergent version of summation for functions with appropriate growth condition is then:

Sum of divergent series 

In the following text,  indicates "Ramanujan summation". This formula originally appeared in one of Ramanujan's notebooks, without any notation to indicate that it exemplified a novel method of summation.

Ramanujan had calculated "sums" of known divergent series.

Extending to positive even powers, this gave:

and for odd powers the approach suggested a relation with the Bernoulli numbers:

It has been proposed to use of C(1) rather than C(0) as the result of Ramanujan's summation, since then it can be assured that one series  admits one and only one Ramanujan's summation, defined as the value in 1 of the only solution of the difference equation  that verifies the condition . 

This demonstration of Ramanujan's summation (denoted as ) does not coincide with the earlier defined Ramanujan's summation, C(0), nor with the summation of convergent series, but it has interesting properties, such as: If R(x) tends to a finite limit when x → 1, then the series  is convergent, and we have

In particular we have:

where  is the Euler–Mascheroni constant.

Extension to integrals 

Ramanujan resummation can be extended to integrals; for example, using the Euler–Maclaurin summation formula, one can write

which is the natural extension to integrals of the Zeta regularization algorithm. 

Note that this involves (see zeta function regularization)

. 

With , the application of this Ramanujan resummation lends to finite results in the renormalization of quantum field theories.

See also 
 Borel summation
 Cesàro summation
 Divergent series
 Ramanujan's sum

References 

Summability methods
Srinivasa Ramanujan